Queen Sinhye of the Jeongju Ryu clan was the first Goryeo queen consort through her marriage as the first wife of Wang Geon, its founder. As the wife and mother of the new nation, she supported her husband's national affairs with a good plan and received great favor and preferential treatment from many people, also become his favourite wife.

Life
The future Queen Sinhye was born into a rich family in Gyeonggi Province as the daughter of Ryu Cheon-gung, a village leader from the Jeongju Ryu clan.

According to legend, Wang Geon, a general commander under Gung Ye passed through the land of Jeongju with his armies to invaded Later Baekje, then resting his horses and sat under an old willow tree for rested for a while. In there, he happened to see and met a young girl, who's standing by the brook of the road. While he seeing her virtuous face, he asked:
"Whose daughter are you?" ("누구의 딸이냐?")
And that girl said:
"I am the daughter of the Lord in this village." ("이 고을의 장자長者집 딸입니다.")
Wang immediately fell in love with her beautiful appearance and wisdom at first sight and stayed at her father's mansion that day where he prepared and served food to all the army members in a very prosperous manner. That girl's father, Lord Ryu ordered his daughter to slept with Wang. Not long after that, Wang immediately left for the battlefield and they lost contact each other, so she then shaved her hair to keep her chastity and became a nun. Meanwhile, Wang learned this belatedly and hurriedly found her, brought her and married her.

At the end of the Taebong period, when Sin Sung-gyeom (신숭겸), Hong Yu (홍유), Bae Hyeon-gyeong (배현경), etc came to seek to drive out Gung Ye in protest against his terror reign and wanted to appoint Wang as the new one, he stubbornly refused and didn't accept it, but hesitated at the same time. Knowing this, Lady Ryu then said: 
 "It has been done since ancient times to defeat greed with righteousness. Now that I have heard the stories of the generals, even women and children will be thrilled and exited. General, what more can I say?"“의(義)로써 탐학함을 물리치는 것은 예로부터 해온 일입니다. 지금 여러 장군들의 이야기를 들으니 아녀자도 분발하겠거늘 하물며 대장부께서야 더 말해 무엇하겠습니까?”
Also encouraged her husband to put on his own armor and participated in protest to start a revolution.

In 918, her husband finally defeated Gung Ye and established the new dynasty, she became the Queen consort. Assisted the national ambassador with good schemes and distinguished herself by assisting her husband with the establishment of important national policies, she received favor and preferential treatment. She also achieved integrity, docile and wise in serving her husband, that made her honoured as Lady of the Hadong County (하동군부인, 河東郡夫人). As such, the Queen received the utmost respect and admiration from many of her peoples, her husband for her contribution in helping the establishment of the Goryeo dynasty.

Meanwhile, they were childless and didn't have any issue.

Based on

In popular culture
Portrayed by Park Sang-ah in the 2000–2002 KBS1 TV Series Taejo Wang Geon.

References

External links
신혜왕후 on Doosan Encyclopedia .

Year of birth unknown
10th-century deaths
Consorts of Taejo of Goryeo
Korean queens consort